Bulldog Breed is a British television sitcom which first aired on ITV in 1962. Tom Bowler is ambitious young man who ends up causing chaos wherever he goes.

Actors who appeared in individual episodes in guest roles include William Mervyn, Claire Davenport, David Conville, Barbara Young, Colin Gordon, Ronald Leigh-Hunt, Reginald Marsh and Wendy Richard.

Main cast
 Donald Churchill as Tom Bowler
 Amanda Barrie as Sandra Prentiss
 Peter Butterworth as Henry Broadbent
 Betty Huntley-Wright as Lilian Broadbent
 Geoffrey Whitehead as Billy Broadbent
 Clare Kelly as Mrs. Norton

References

Bibliography
 Self, David. Situation Comedy, Volume 1. Hutchinson, 1980.

External links
 

ITV sitcoms
1962 British television series debuts
1962 British television series endings
1960s British comedy television series
English-language television shows
Television shows produced by Granada Television